Bazilionai  is a small town in Šiauliai County in northern-central Lithuania. As of 2011, the estimated population was 390.

History
In 1744, King Augustus III granted a privilege to organize regular fairs in the town. Before monks of the Order of Saint Basil the Great arrived to the town in 1749, it was known as Padubysys (literally: near Dubysa). 

The Basilian Fathers established a parish school in 1773. After 20 years, the school had 192 students and was reorganized into six-year school. The monastery and school was closed by the Tsarist authorities after the failed uprising in 1830. 

The town church was transformed into an Eastern Orthodox one. After Lithuania regained independence in 1919, the church was reformed back to a Catholic one.

Before World War II, the Jewish community of the village had 130 members. All of them were murdered in a mass execution perpetrated  by an einsatzgruppen of Germans and Lithuanian nationalists in 1941.

References

External links

 Website of Bazilionai community

Towns in Lithuania
Towns in Šiauliai County
Shavelsky Uyezd
Holocaust locations in Lithuania